Rolled plate is a type of industrially produced glass. It was invented and patented by James Hartley circa 1847. Rolled plate is used architecturally; for example, in the mid-19th century uses for rolled plate glass included roofing railway stations and greenhouses.

References

Glass production
Industrial processes
History of glass